The FIL European Luge Championships 1954 took place in Davos, Switzerland under the auspices of the Fédération Internationale de Bobsleigh et de Tobogganing (FIBT - International Bobsleigh and Tobogganing Federation in ) under their "Section de Luge", a trend that would continue until the International Luge Federation (FIL) was formed in 1957. An American delegation participated in this event, giving way to the creation of the first World luge championships that would be organized the following year in Oslo, Norway.

Men's singles

Women's singles

Scheimpflug was the first Italian woman to medal at the championships.

Doubles

Medal table

References
"Luge and Olympisim" Olympic Review. #194. December 1983. p. 852.
Men's doubles European champions
Men's singles European champions
Women's singles European champions

FIL European Luge Championships
1954 in luge
Luge in Switzerland
1954 in Swiss sport